NH 129 may refer to:

 National Highway 129 (India)
 New Hampshire Route 129, United States